Bruce Allen (born October 26, 1956) is a former American football executive. He served as general manager for two teams in the National Football League (NFL): the Tampa Bay Buccaneers from 2004 to 2008 and the Washington Redskins from 2009 to 2019. He got his start in the NFL as a senior executive with the Oakland Raiders in 1995.

Allen played college football at the University of Richmond and was selected by the Baltimore Colts in the 1978 NFL Draft, but never played in the NFL. He spent 1979 as the head football coach at Occidental College in Los Angeles. Allen is the son of Pro Football Hall of Fame coach George Allen and brother of former Virginia governor and United States Senator George Allen.

Playing and coaching career
Allen is the son of Pro Football Hall of Fame coach George Allen and brother of former Virginia governor and Senator George Allen. Allen attended high school at Langley High School in McLean, Virginia in the early 1970s, and attended the University of Richmond, where he played college football for the Spiders from 1974 to 1977. In his junior season, he ranked 16th nationally and broke the school record for punting, averaging 42.9 yards a kick; those numbers resulted in him being named to that year's All-ECAC and All-South Independent teams. He was drafted by the Baltimore Colts in the 12th round of the 1978 NFL Draft, but did not play for the team.

Allen began his coaching career in 1978 when was hired as a graduate assistant at Arizona State University to serve on the football coaching staff under head coach Frank Kush. In 1979, Allen was the head football coach at Occidental College, a small NCAA Division III school in Los Angeles, where he led them to a 2–6–1 record before resigning after the season to coach the Los Angeles Thunderbolts of the California Football League  in 1980.

Executive career

USFL
Allen was the general manager of the Chicago Blitz in 1983 and Arizona Wranglers in 1984.

Oakland Raiders
Allen first joined the Oakland Raiders organization in 1995. He won the George Young Executive of the Year award with the club during their AFC Championship year in 2002.

Tampa Bay Buccaneers
Following the 2003 season, the Tampa Bay Buccaneers released general manager Rich McKay, whose relationship with Super Bowl XXXVII-winning coach Jon Gruden had deteriorated. The Glazer family, which owned and oversaw the Buccaneers, hired Allen to replace McKay, as Allen had previously worked with Gruden in Oakland. Allen immediately began looking for a more youthful team. This included releasing long-time Buccaneer John Lynch and allowing Warren Sapp to leave for free agency, along with drafting Auburn running back Cadillac Williams in the 2005 NFL Draft.

The Buccaneers performance during Allen's tenure was mixed. His first year there, the team went 5–11. The next year however, they were 11–5 and won the NFC South division in 2005, but went 4–12 in 2006. The team rebounded to a 9–7 record and another NFC South title in 2007, after which Allen had his contract extended to 2011. Following a second 9–7 record in 2008 and missing the playoffs after four consecutive losses in December, however, both Allen and Gruden were fired.

Washington Redskins
On December 17, 2009, the Washington Redskins announced that they had hired Allen as their general manager shortly after executive vice president of football operations Vinny Cerrato resigned. Allen's father coached the Redskins to its first Super Bowl appearance in 1972. Shortly after Allen joined the Redskins, Jim Zorn and his staff were fired, allowing Mike Shanahan to be hired as head coach and executive vice president of football operations. While Shanahan had the final say in football decisions, he and Allen split the duties of general manager, working in an arrangement similar to how Bill Belichick and Scott Pioli operated with the New England Patriots at the time. For the uncapped season in 2010, the League had advised all teams to not explicitly use it as a method to create cap room in the future when the salary cap would return. Allen and the team failed to heed the warnings of the league and did so anyway. As a result, Washington suffered a 36 million salary cap penalty split between the 2012 and 2013 seasons. 

After Shanahan was fired following the 2013 season, Allen took over his role and had final say on football operations, choosing Cincinnati Bengals offensive coordinator Jay Gruden to replace Shanahan as head coach. While general manager, Allen attempted to bridge the connection between the modern Redskins and the glory years of past, include hosting golf tournaments with former players and coaches, to bringing back the gold pants that his father's team had used in the 1970s. 

In 2014, Allen was officially given the co-title of president. Allen abdicated his title of general manager after the Redskins hired Scot McCloughan to be their new one on January 7, 2015, later becoming the de facto general manager again upon the firing of McCloughan after the 2016 season. Allen's tenure with the team was met with heavy criticism and disapproval, with a popular "FireBruceAllen" hashtag campaign being used on social media throughout the latter half of the 2010s, before he was fired following a 3–13 season in 2019. The team had only made two postseason appearances under Allen, winning neither of them.

In October 2021, emails between Allen and football coach and commentator Jon Gruden were leaked to The New York Times. According to the emails, Gruden sent several sexist, racist, and homophobic remarks to Allen throughout the 2010s. The two also exchanged topless photos of Washington cheerleaders. Gruden resigned as head coach of the Las Vegas Raiders following the report.

Head coaching record

References

1956 births
Living people
Arizona State Sun Devils football coaches
Oakland Raiders executives
Occidental Tigers football coaches
Richmond Spiders football players
Tampa Bay Buccaneers executives
Washington Redskins executives
National Football League general managers
National Football League team presidents
People from McLean, Virginia
Sportspeople from Fairfax County, Virginia
Coaches of American football from Virginia
Players of American football from Pasadena, California
Players of American football from Virginia
Allen family
American people of Tunisian-Jewish descent